This is a list of provinces of Rwanda by Human Development Index as of 2021.

See also 

 List of countries by Human Development Index

References 

Rwanda
Rwanda
Human Development Index